Klaus Nielsen (born 8 January 1980 in Køge) is a Danish professional mountain biker. He has won four Danish national championship titles in both men's cross-country and marathon races, and also represented his nation Denmark, as a 28-year-old senior, at the 2008 Summer Olympics. Nielsen currently trains and races professionally for Germany's Team ALB-Gold Mountain Bike Team.

Nielsen qualified for the Danish squad, along with his teammate Jakob Fuglsang, in the men's cross-country race at the 2008 Summer Olympics in Beijing by receiving one of the nation's two available berths for his team from the Union Cycliste Internationale (UCI), based on his top-ten performance at the World Cup series and Mountain Biking World Series. With one lap to go, Nielsen struggled to keep his form throughout a 4.8-km sturdy, treacherous cross-country course, and instead pulled off directly from the race by taking the thirty-first spot.

References

External links
NBC 2008 Olympics profile

1980 births
Living people
Danish male cyclists
Cross-country mountain bikers
Cyclists at the 2008 Summer Olympics
Olympic cyclists of Denmark
People from Køge Municipality
Sportspeople from Region Zealand